Arthur Edwin Henley (14 September 1878 – 18 April 1941) was an Australian rules footballer who played for the South Melbourne Football Club in the Victorian Football League (VFL).

Notes

External links 

1878 births
1941 deaths
Australian rules footballers from Melbourne
Sydney Swans players
People from South Melbourne